Mark Stevens (born in Lynn, Massachusetts) is a criminal defense lawyer in Salem, New Hampshire. He graduated from the University of New Hampshire and the Massachusetts School of Law.  His publications include, A Practical Guide to Trying DWI Cases in New Hampshire (2010) and the Pocket Guide to Juror Voir Dire in Massachusetts: Criminal Practice (2015).   His clients have included Jeffrey Dingman, who was paroled in 2014 after a double murder conviction for killing his parents.  Stevens also represented Pamela Smart co-conspirators Patrick Randall in 2015, and Vance Lattime, Jr. in 2005.  In 2011, he represented John Coughlin in a widely covered speeding case.  Coughlin was cited by state police for driving 102 miles per hour because his wife was delivering a baby as he rushed to the hospital; his speeding charge was dismissed after trial.  In 2016, Stevens successfully obtained a court order forcing the State of New Hampshire to return the handgun used as the murder weapon in the case of State v. Pamela Smart.

Solicitor
Stevens began his legal career as a freelancer in 1975 before becoming a defence lawyer.

References

Living people
People from Lynn, Massachusetts
University of New Hampshire alumni
Massachusetts School of Law alumni
New Hampshire lawyers
1951 births